Donghuishe is a town of Pingshan County in the eastern foothills of the Taihang Mountains in southwestern Hebei province, China, located  west of the county seat. , it has 37 villages under its administration.

See also
List of township-level divisions of Hebei

References

Township-level divisions of Hebei
Pingshan County, Hebei